The Delaware Valley Collegiate Hockey Conference (DVCHC) is a collegiate hockey conference associated with the Collegiate Hockey Federation (CHF) and independent women's university teams. The conference has men's teams that compete within divisions II and III of the CHF and women's teams that compete in divisions I and II.

The first season (1971–1972), The league consisted of six teams: Bryn Athyn College, LaSalle, St Josephs University, University of Delaware, Villanova, and West Chester.

Format 
The Men's Division has 24 current members that are split into three divisions. The National is considered the higher division. The season ends each year with division playoffs.

The Women's Division has 14 current members split in two divisions. Division 2 has a North and a South section whereas all of the teams in Division 1 are in one section.

Current Men's teams

Tournament Bound

Non-Tournament Bound

Current Women's teams

Division I

Division II North

Division II South

Men's Championships

Tournament Bound (2021-present)
2022-Alvernia University
2021-not played (COVID-19)

Non-tournament Bound (2021-present)
2022-Bucknell University
2021-not played (COVID-19)

Division II (1972-2005 & 2018-2020)
2020- Kutztown University of Pennsylvania defeated Penn State Harrisburg
2019- Drexel University
2018- Lafayette College
2006- University of Scranton defeated The College of New Jersey 2 games to 1 
2005- Temple University 
2004- Temple University
2003- Temple University
2002- Lafayette College
2001- Lafayette College
2000- University of Pennsylvania 
1999- Saint Joseph's University
1998- Saint Joseph's University
1997- Princeton University
1996- Princeton University
1995- Millersville University of Pennsylvania 
1994- Kutztown University of Pennsylvania
1993- Millersville University of Pennsylvania 
1992- Millersville University of Pennsylvania & Franklin & Marshall College 
1991- Franklin & Marshall College 
1990- Temple University
1989- Franklin & Marshall College 
1988- Drexel University 
1987- Drexel University
1986- La Salle University
1985- Drexel University
1984- Saint Joseph's University
1983- La Salle University
1982- Saint Joseph's University 
1981- Saint Joseph's University
1980- Lafayette College
1979- Lafayette College
1978- Thomas Jefferson University, known as Textile at the time
1977- Drexel University
1976- University of Delaware
1975- University of Delaware
1974- West Chester University of Pennsylvania
1973- University of Delaware
1972- Bryn Athyn College & West Chester University of Pennsylvania

Division 3 National Division (2003-2020)
2020- University of Delaware defeated Stockton University
2019- George Mason University 
2018- George Mason University
2017- Bryn Athyn College
2016- Bryn Athyn College
2015- Bryn Athyn College (Beat Richard Stockton)
2014- Neumann (Beat Bryn Athyn College in Best of three 2-0)
2013- Neumann (Beat Alvernia in Best of three 2-0)
2012- Penn State Brandywine (Beat Alvernia in Best of Three 2-1)
2011- West Chester University
2010- Penn State Brandywine
2009- Monmouth University
2008- Lehigh University
2007- Penn State-Berks
2006- Penn State-Berks
2005- Penn State-Berks
2004- Penn State-Berks
2003- Penn State-Berks

Division 3 American Division (2011-2020)
2020- Catholic University of America defeated Rutgers University-Camden
2019- Rutgers University-Camden
2018- Bucknell University
2017- Rutgers University-Camden
2016- Johns Hopkins University
2015- Rutgers University-Camden
2014- Rowan
2013- Bryn Athyn College
2012- Rowan University
2011- Bloomsburg University of Pennsylvania

Division 3 Patriot Division (2018-2020)
2020- York College of Pennsylvania defeated Gettysburg College
2019- Catholic University of America
2018- Franklin & Marshall College

Women's Championships 

2023- D2: Navy | D3: Slippery Rock University
2022- D2: Navy | D3: Saint Joseph's University
2021- Season Cancelled (Pandemic)
2020- D2: Rowan | D3:  Lafayette
2019- D2: Rowan | D3: Saint Joseph's University
2018- D2: Montclair State | D3: Virginia
2017- D2: Villanova | D3: Rowan
2016- D1: Towson | D2: Columbia
2015- D1: Towson | D2: Rowan
2014- D1: Towson | D2: Pennsylvania
2013- D1: West Chester | D2: Rutgers
2012- D1: West Chester | D2: Rutgers
2011- D1: California (PA) | D2: Navy
2010- D1: Virginia | D2: Slippery Rock
2009- D1: Virginia | D2: California (PA)
2008- D1: Delaware | D2: West Chester
2007- D1: American
2006- D1: Virginia
2005- D1: Pennsylvania
2004- D1: Pennsylvania
2003- D1: Penn State

See also 
Collegiate Hockey Federation
www.chfhockey.net
CHF Division II
CHF Division III
American Collegiate Hockey Association
List of ice hockey leagues

ACHA Division 2 conferences

ACHA Division 3 conferences